The Lagoa–Barra Highway (Portuguese:Autoestrada Lagoa–Barra), officially named Engenheiro Fernando Mac Dowell Highway in honour of Fernando Mac Dowell, is a highway linking Gávea and Barra da Tijuca in Rio de Janeiro, Brazil. The highway was opened in 1971.

References

Transport in Rio de Janeiro (city)
Highways in Rio de Janeiro (state)